Mark Spencer (July 5, 1787 – January 28, 1859) was an American merchant and politician from New York.

Life
He was the son of Mark Spencer (1738–1815) and Huldah Parmelee (Collins) Spencer.

He was a member of the New York State Senate (5th D.) from 1854 to 1857, sitting in the 77th, 78th, 79th and 80th New York State Legislatures. On January 24, 1857, he was elected President pro tempore of the State Senate.

Sources
The New York Civil List compiled by Franklin Benjamin Hough (pages 137 and 145; Weed, Parsons and Co., 1858)
Pen and Ink Portraits of the Senators, Assemblymen, and State Officers of New York by G. W. Bungay (1857; pg. 61)
LAW REPORTS; SURROGATE's COURT; WILLS OFFERED FOR PROBATE in NYT on February 4, 1859
Mark Spencer at Ancestry.com

1787 births
1859 deaths
Democratic Party New York (state) state senators
Politicians from New York City
19th-century American politicians